Jim Duncan (born 2 April 1938) is an English former professional footballer who played as an inside forward.

Career
Born in Hull, Duncan played for Hull City, Bradford City and Bridlington Town.

References

1938 births
Living people
English footballers
Hull City A.F.C. players
Bradford City A.F.C. players
Bridlington Town A.F.C. players
English Football League players
Association football forwards